Absolute is a music compilation album under both the Body and Soul and Midnight Soul collection series. Distributed by Time-Life through its music division, the album was released January 28, 2003 and was originally under the Body and Soul series. It was re-released in 2008 when Time-Life launched the Midnight Soul series.

It is distributed both in two versions: the single CD sold-in-stores and the Time-Life exclusive version on the double CD set. The sold-in-stores version features seventeen urban contemporary R&B hits, with many of them released in the Neo soul music era. The Time-Life exclusive version features 24 hits on 2 CDs, including seven more songs not featured in stores.

Track listing

sold-in-stores version
 Alicia Keys – A Woman's Worth
 K-Ci & JoJo – All My Life
 Monica – Angel of Mine
 Brian McKnight – Anytime
 Angie Stone – Brotha
 Boyz II Men – Four Seasons Of Loneliness
 Rome – I Belong to You (Every Time I See Your Face)
 Joe – I Wanna Know
 D'Angelo – Lady
 Usher – Nice and Slow
 Deborah Cox – Nobody's Supposed to Be Here
 Jimmy Cozier – She's All I Got
 Tyrese – Sweet Lady
 Luther Vandross – Take You Out
 Next – Too Close
 Toni Braxton – Unbreak My Heart
 Babyface – When Can I See You

Time-Life exclusive version

Disc one
 Joe – I Wanna Know
 D'Angelo – Lady
 Angie Stone – Brotha
 Lucy Pearl – Dance Tonight
 Usher – Nice and Slow
 Monica – Angel of Mine
 Rome – I Belong to You (Every Time I See Your Face)
 K-Ci & JoJo – All My Life
 En Vogue – Giving Him Something He Can Feel
 Brian McKnight – Anytime
 Jimmy Cozier – She's All I Got
 Tyrese – Sweet Lady

Disc two
 Alicia Keys – A Woman's Worth
 Next – Too Close
 Luther Vandross – Take You Out
 Toni Braxton – Unbreak My Heart
 Babyface – When Can I See You
 R.L. – Good Man
 Boyz II Men – Four Seasons Of Loneliness
 SWV – You're the One
 Shanice – When I Close My Eyes
 Tony Rich – Nobody Knows
 Az Yet and Peter Cetera – Hard to Say I'm Sorry
 Deborah Cox – Nobody's Supposed to Be Here

References

2003 compilation albums
2008 compilation albums
Rhythm and blues compilation albums
Time–Life albums